Remaissance Charter School may refer to:

 Boston Renaissance Charter Public School
 The Renaissance Charter School, Jackson Heights, Queens, New York City
 Renaissance Charter School at Doral, Doral, Florida
 Renaissance Charter Schools at Pines, Pembroke Pines, Florida
 Renaissance Charter School at Cypress, West Palm Beach, Florida